The 2012–13 North Carolina Central Eagles men's basketball team represented North Carolina Central University during the 2012–13 NCAA Division I men's basketball season. The Eagles, led by fourth year head coach LeVelle Moton, played their home games at the McLendon–McDougald Gymnasium and were members of the Mid-Eastern Athletic Conference. They finished the season 22–9, 15–1 in MEAC play to finish in second place. They lost in the quarterfinals of the MEAC tournament to North Carolina A&T. Despite the 22 wins, they did not participate in a postseason tournament.

Roster

Schedule

|-
!colspan=9| Regular season

|-
!colspan=9| 2013 MEAC men's basketball tournament

References

North Carolina Central Eagles men's basketball seasons
North Carolina Central